The Taça Nacional de Futsal Feminino is the women's futsal second level in Portugal founded in 1996, played under UEFA rules and is operated by the Portuguese Football Federation. It is contested by the 24 winners and the runners-up of best ranked regional leagues (Distritais). The top-four teams are promoted to the next season of the Campeonato Nacional Futsal Feminino.

Until the creation of Campeonato Nacional Futsal Feminino in 2013–14, the Taça Nacional de Futsal Feminino was the premier level in Portuguese women's futsal.

Format
The 24 teams are divided into eight groups (four North and four South) of three teams. The top two teams of each group move to the second phase consisting of four pools (two North and two South) of four teams each.
The winner of each group plays the final pool of the title. All four teams are promoted to next season Campeonato Nacional Futsal Feminino.
All phases are contested in a round-robin format

Champions by year

Performance by club

References

External links
Official website
Magiadofutsal (archived)

Football leagues in Portugal
Futsal competitions in Portugal
Sports leagues established in 1996
1996 establishments in Portugal
Women's football competitions in Portugal
Women's futsal leagues